Hump Creek is a stream in the U.S. state of South Dakota.

Hump Creek takes its name from nearby Hump Butte.

See also
List of rivers of South Dakota

References

Rivers of Corson County, South Dakota
Rivers of South Dakota